Lisskulla Jobs (born Karin Helfrid Berglund; 25 June 1906 – 15 August 1996) was a Swedish stage and film actress. She appeared in more than 30 films between 1925 and 1990.

Selected filmography
 Ingmar's Inheritance (1925)
 The Lady of the Camellias (1925)
 The Triumph of the Heart (1929)
 Baldwin's Wedding (1938)
 The Heavenly Play (1942)
 The Sin of Anna Lans (1943)
 Kungsgatan (1943)
 Crime and Punishment (1945)
 Motherhood (1945)
Widower Jarl (1945)
 Two Stories Up (1950)

References

External links

 

1906 births
1996 deaths
Swedish film actresses
Swedish silent film actresses
Swedish stage actresses
20th-century Swedish actresses
People from Leksand Municipality